Pyroderces sarcogypsa is a moth in the family Cosmopterigidae first described by Edward Meyrick in 1932. It is found in Japan, the Russian Far East and the Chinese provinces of Fujian, Guizhou and Jiangxi.

The wingspan is 13–15 mm. The ground colour of the forewings are ochreous yellow, but white along the distal five-sixths of the costal margin and yellowish white from below the fold to the dorsal margin. There is a longitudinal white line along the upper margin of the cell.

References

Moths described in 1932
sarcogypsa